Luzon is the largest island in the Philippines. Luzon may also refer to:

Places
Luzon Strait between Taiwan and Luzon island
Urban Luzon on Luzon island
Luzon island group: Luzon plus other islands nearby
Luzón, a municipality in Castile-La Mancha, Spain
Luzon, West Virginia, an unincorporated community

In the military
Battle of Luzon, a World War II battle between the Allies and Japan
, a United States Navy gunboat
, a United States Navy repair ship

Buildings
Luzon Apartment Building, Washington, DC
Luzon Building, Tacoma, Washington state

People
Luzon B. Morris (1827-1895), American lawyer and Connecticut governor
Luzon Sukezaemon (1565?-?), Japanese businessman
Avraham Luzon (born 1955), Israeli football executive
Guy Luzon (born 1975), Israeli football coach and former player
Omri Luzon (born 1999), Israeli footballer
Yaniv Luzon (born 1981), Israeli footballer
Manila Luzon  (born 1981), American drag queen and reality television personality

See also